Kevin Layne Jr. (1 January 1998) is a Guyanese professional footballer who plays for Cosmopolitan Soccer League club Sunnydale FC and the Guyana national team. Primarily a centre-back, he can also play as a defensive midfielder.

References

External links 
 
 

1998 births
Living people
Sportspeople from Georgetown, Guyana
Guyanese footballers
Association football central defenders
Association football midfielders
Monedderlust FC players
Guyana Defence Force FC players
Mount Pleasant Football Academy players
National Premier League players
Guyana youth international footballers
Guyana international footballers
Guyanese expatriate footballers
Guyanese expatriate sportspeople in Jamaica
Expatriate footballers in Jamaica